The 2017–18 season was the 15th season in the Football League and the 3rd consecutive season at the fourth tier of English football  played by Yeovil Town Football Club, an English football club based in Yeovil, Somerset.

Manager Darren Way was starting his second full season in charge, the club signed thirteen players on permanent and loan contracts before the close of the summer transfer window, although one was released without having made an appearance. After losing their opening game by a record 8–2 scoreline away at Luton Town. The club's league season had few highpoints as they spent all but one week of the season in the lower half of the table, the Glovers did record their record away victory in the Football League in April with a 6–2 win at Coventry City. Despite indifferent form safety was confirmed with two matches to spare as Yeovil finished the season in 19th place.

In cup competitions Yeovil had more success reaching the fourth round of the FA Cup for only the fourth time in their history, beating two League One sides to get there, before losing at home to eventual runners-up Manchester United. In the EFL Cup the Glovers lost in the first round against Championship side Wolverhampton Wanderers, while in the EFL Trophy the club reached the semi-finals, losing to Shrewsbury Town having beaten three League One sides to reach that stage. Ivorian striker François Zoko finished as the club's top goalscorer for the third consecutive season with fifteen goals, thirteen of which he scored in the league.

Background

The 2016–17 season was the club's second consecutive in the fourth tier of the English football league system, it was Darren Way's first full season in charge as manager. After winning their opening game, Yeovil lost six of their next seven matches leaving them in the relegation zone in September before an improved run of form, including eight matches unbeaten saw the club rise into the play-offs after a 5–0 victory against Crawley Town in December 2016. This though was the highpoint of the season as Yeovil only won three of their final 27 matches as the club slid dangerously towards the relegation zone, but safety was confirmed with one match to spare as Yeovil finished the season in 20th place. In cup competitions, Yeovil were knocked out in the first round of the FA Cup, losing to non-league side Solihull Moors in a replay, while the Glovers progressed to the second round of the EFL Cup losing to Premier League side Everton. The club also reached the quarter-finals of the revamped EFL Trophy, losing to Luton Town.

The end of the season saw Way release six players, including, Ollie Bassett, Tom Eaves, Brandon Goodship, Alex Lawless, Joe Lea and captain Darren Ward. Nine players were offered new contracts by Darren Way, defender Nathan Smith agreed a new one-year contract, while forward François Zoko, winger Otis Khan, defenders Bevis Mugabi, Tom James and keeper Jonny Maddison also agreed new two-year contracts. Midfielder Kevin Dawson rejected the offer of a new contract to sign for fellow League Two side Cheltenham Town and reunite with former manager Gary Johnson. Defender Alex Lacey rejected the club's offer of a new two-year contract and signed for League One side Gillingham. Meanwhile, midfielder Matthew Dolan rejected the club's offer to sign for fellow League Two side Newport County.

Review

Pre-season

The first day of pre-season saw the arrival of four new signings, winger Rhys Browne, son of ex-Glover Steve Browne, joined from Grimsby Town for an undisclosed fee signing a two-year contract, midfielder Jake Gray also signed a two-year contract for an undisclosed fee from Luton Town. Meanwhile, Connor Smith joined following his release from Plymouth Argyle, and Guadeloupean international defender Stéphane Zubar signed a one-year contract after rejecting an offer of a new contract at local rivals Weymouth. On 4 July, Yeovil confirmed their fifth signing of pre-season with midfielder James Bailey signing a two-year contract after leaving Carlisle United, prior to Yeovil's first friendly of pre-season, the club confirmed the signing of Southampton striker Olufela Olomola on loan until January 2018.

Yeovil's first friendly of the season saw them travel to local rivals, Southern League Premier side Weymouth, on 11 July. Yeovil's squad included nine trialists, goals from Otis Khan and Bevis Mugabi earned the Glovers a 2–1 victory after former Yeovil striker Brandon Goodship had given Weymouth the lead. On 14 July, Yeovil completed their seventh signing of the season with young defender Keston Davies joining on loan until the end of the season from Swansea City. Davies made his first appearance the following day in Yeovil's first home friendly against Championship club Bristol City, on 15 July. Three goals in six first half minutes saw Yeovil succumb to a 3–1 defeat with Olomola scoring a consolation goal. Yeovil then traveled to South Wales for a short training camp, where on 19 July they faced Welsh Football League Division One club Llanelli Town, and recorded a 2–0 victory over their Welsh opponents with goals from Khan and François Zoko. On 22 July, Yeovil faced local side Frome Town in a friendly organised as a benefit match for local semi-professional footballer Jamie Mines, who suffered serious injuries following an electrical shock at work. Despite falling behind to their Southern League opponents goals from Nathan Smith and Rhys Browne earned Yeovil a fourth victory of pre-season. After a successful trial Yeovil confirmed the signing of Brazilian former Derby County midfielder Alefe Santos on a two-year contract. Yeovil then entertained League One club Bristol Rovers and suffered their second 3–1 defeat of pre-season with Nathan Smith scoring the Glovers only goal. On 28 July, Yeovil confirmed their ninth signing of pre-season with former Swansea City right back Daniel Alfei signing a two-year contract following a successful trial. Yeovil then traveled to Tiverton Town for their penultimate friendly of pre-season an entertaining match saw a brace from Connor Smith and goals from Zoko and Alefe Santos as the Glovers ran out 4–2 winners. Yeovil completed their pre-season schedule with a 3–1 defeat against Premier League side Bournemouth, with Swansea loanee Keston Davies scoring for the Glovers. Following the Bournemouth match, summer signing James Bailey was announced as Yeovil's new captain for the 2017–18 season replacing the released Darren Ward. Prior to the first competitive game of the season, Yeovil completed the signing of Sam Surridge on loan from Bournemouth until the end of the season.

August
Yeovil started their League Two season away against Luton Town, on 5 August. Despite taking the lead through an Otis Khan free kick, Yeovil suffered a record 8–2 defeat the heaviest opening day defeat in the Football League for 55 years, with François Zoko scoring the Glovers second consolation goal. After falling to their joint record Football League defeat on the opening day, the players agreed to refund the 258 fans who traveled to watch the team at Luton. On 8 August, Yeovil confirmed that centre-back Stéphane Zubar had been released from his "month-to-month" contract due to injury, without having made a competitive appearance. Yeovil then traveled to Championship club Wolverhampton Wanderers in the first round of the EFL Cup, a much improved performance saw Yeovil suffer a 1–0 defeat to exit the competition.

Yeovil then faced Accrington Stanley in their first home match of the season, a brace from Southampton loanee Olufela Olomola and a second goal of the season from Zoko saw Yeovil recover from falling behind to record a 3–2 victory. On 16 August, Yeovil completed the signing of versatile forward Jordan Green on a free transfer from Bournemouth. Yeovil then traveled to newly promoted Forest Green Rovers, early goals from Olomola and an Otis Khan penalty saw Yeovil take a 2–0 lead, after Forest Green pulled one back Zoko scored to give Yeovil a 3–1 lead but the Glovers collapsed in the second half to lose the match 4–3.

On 21 August, having conceded 14 goals in their first three league matches Yeovil moved to sign defender Sid Nelson on loan from Millwall until January. The signing of Nelson had an immediate impact with Yeovil recording their first clean sheet of the season in a 2–0 victory over Coventry City, on 26 August, with Rhys Browne scoring his first for the club and Olomola scoring his fourth of the season. On 29 August, Yeovil rounded off the month with a trip to Exeter City for their first match in the EFL Trophy group stages. The Glovers secured a 3–1 win with all the goals coming in the second half, a goal from Sam Surridge,  his first for the club, was followed by goals for Rhys Browne and Otis Khan. Deadline day saw Yeovil complete the signing of Bournemouth midfielder Matt Worthington on loan until January.

September
Yeovil began September with a 2–0 defeat away at Crawley Town, followed by a goalless draw at home against Cheltenham Town. On 12 September, Yeovil faced Morecambe but despite taking a 2–0 lead through goals from François Zoko and Sam Surridge, Yeovil failed to see the game out and succumbed to a 2–2 draw. The Glovers then traveled to Grimsby Town and suffered an eighth successive away defeat in the league despite Zoko's fifth goal of the season. On 23 September, Yeovil faced bottom of the league side Port Vale but were held to a 1–1 draw with Otis Khan rescuing a point. After eight consecutive defeats away from home in the league Yeovil traveled to Chesterfield and won 3–2, after early goals from Olufela Olomola and Khan gave the Glovers a two-goal lead before being pegged back to 2–2 scored a last-minute winner from captain James Bailey. Yeovil ended the month with a visit from Colchester United where Yeovil's unbeaten home record came to an end with a 1–0 defeat.

October
After a stuttering start to the season it was reported that manager Darren Way had invited former Tottenham Hotspur manager Harry Redknapp to join the club in a voluntary advisory role. On 7 October, Yeovil suffered another away defeat this time away at Newport County losing 2–0 with both goals coming from corners taken by former player Matthew Dolan. After suffering a knee injury in Yeovil's 1–1 draw with Port Vale in September, it was confirmed that right-back Daniel Alfei had been ruled out for the season after rupturing his anterior cruciate ligament. On 11 October, Yeovil's under-18 side faced Bishop Sutton in the first round of the Somerset Premier Cup and won 1–0 with a late goal from Neville Nzembela. The following day saw the club announce the engagement of football consultant Mark Palmer of Insight 63 Ltd in a new advisory role.

Yeovil then faced Crewe Alexandra and picked up their first home win since August with goals from Rhys Browne and Olufela Olomola enough to secure a 2–0 victory. The club then slipped to a sixth defeat in seven away league matches with a 2–1 defeat at Cambridge United, on 17 October. On 21 October, an Otis Khan goal rescued a late point for Yeovil at Barnet in a 1–1 draw. Yeovil returned to Huish Park for the first of three consecutive home matches, on 25 October, the Glovers faced Chelsea U23s in the group stage of the EFL Trophy, winger Rhys Browne scored for the second home game in a row as the match ended 1–1 in normal time. Yeovil then picked up a bonus point after a 5–3 victory in the 'ABBA' penalty shootout. After the game, Darren Way confirmed that the club had employed former U18 manager Jamie Shore as a new first team coach.

On 28 October, Yeovil triumphed 3–0 at home to Stevenage with a brace from Sam Surridge and Olomola's seventh of the season all coming in the first half. The second half saw the Glovers reduced to nine men after both Olomola was dismissed for his part in a halfway line melee, and François Zoko was dismissed for a dangerously high foot. The match saw the inclusion of under-18 goalkeeper Tommy Scott on the substitutes bench for the first time after back-up goalkeeper Jonny Maddison suffered a head injury in training. The club later attempted to appeal the red card shown to Olomola but were ultimately unsuccessful. The end of the month saw the under-18 side be knocked out of the FA Youth Cup at the first round stage after losing 3–0 at home to Exeter City.

November
Yeovil began November with an FA Cup first round match against League One side Southend United, Otis Khan scored the only goal of the game, a penalty in the 29th minute, enough to send Yeovil through to the second round. This was followed up however, by a 4–0 away loss at Carlisle United, where Bevis Mugabi received a red card for an off the ball incident.

The third match of the month finished with a 2–1 loss at Huish Park, against Swindon Town, with Yeovil having taken the lead after just four minutes, with a goal from Rhys Browne. Yeovil then faced league leaders Notts County, on 21 November, a François Zoko penalty was enough to earn a 1–1 draw, despite a late red card for defender Sid Nelson for violent conduct. The Glovers then traveled to Wycombe Wanderers but two goals in the space of six first half minutes saw Yeovil consigned to yet another away defeat with Zoko grabbing what turned out to be a consolation goal as Yeovil lost 2–1. Yeovil's final match of the EFL Trophy group stage saw them triumph 2–1 against League One side Plymouth Argyle, with Tom James scoring his first goal for the club, and Bournemouth loanee Sam Surridge scoring his fifth goal of the season. The result was enough to see Yeovil top their group and qualify for the second round.

December
On 1 December, Yeovil confirmed the signing of midfielder Oscar Gobern on non-contract terms until the end of the season. Yeovil began December with a FA Cup second round tie against fellow League Two side Port Vale, the game ended 1–1 after a late header from substitute Jordan Green earned Yeovil a replay. The Glovers then faced League One side AFC Wimbledon in the second round of the EFL Trophy, first goals for the club from Keston Davies and Jake Gray secured Yeovil a comfortable 2–0 victory and progression into the third round. On 8 December, youth team defender Jeremiah Gyebi joined National League South side Poole Town on an initial month's loan deal. Yeovil's first league match of the month saw them succumb to a third home defeat of the season losing 2–0 to Lincoln City. On 12 December, Yeovil hosted Port Vale in their FA Cup second round replay, the two sides finished regular time with another 1–1 draw, with Otis Khan scoring a penalty in the first half, before a late equaliser for Port Vale, who had two men sent off. Khan scored a second in extra time, but after Port Vale equalised again, François Zoko scored the game's winner a minute later to send Yeovil through to the third round.

Yeovil then traveled to Mansfield Town and held their play-off chasing opponents to a goalless draw to record their first away clean sheet since February 2017, but the result saw them slip to 21st in the table only one point outside the relegation zone. On 23 December, Yeovil beat third place side Exeter City 3–1 with goals from Jake Gray, François Zoko and a Sam Surridge penalty. Boxing Day saw the Glovers travel to Cheltenham Town and record a second consecutive victory, second-half goals from Omar Sowunmi and Jordan Green earned Yeovil a 2–0 victory. Yeovil ended 2017 with a trip to Morecambe, the Glovers took the lead after just 25-seconds with Jake Gray scoring his third goal of December, Otis Khan's tenth goal of the season doubled Yeovil's lead, but a late collapse saw Yeovil lose the match 4–3, despite Omar Sowunmi giving Yeovil a 3–2 lead with just six minutes to go. Khan's goal against Morecambe was later awarded the League Two goal of the month award.

January
Yeovil started the new year with a home fixture against Crawley Town, despite taking the lead through Sam Surridge the Glovers lost the match 2–1 having been reduced to nine men with both Connor Smith and Omar Sowunmi being sent off. The first week of the January transfer window saw a high turnover of players with the loans of Sid Nelson, Olufela Olomola and Matt Worthington expiring while the loan of Keston Davies was terminated after he had failed to break into the Yeovil side. The four loans were replaced with Liverpool defender Corey Whelan, Barnsley midfielder Jared Bird, Middlesbrough attacking midfielder Lewis Wing and Southampton striker Marcus Barnes all joining the club on loan until the end of the season from their respective clubs. On 6 January, Yeovil faced League One side Bradford City in the third round of the FA Cup. Despite being the lowest ranked team left in the competition, Yeovil won the match 2–0 with a goal from Marcus Barnes on his debut and a third of the season from Jordan Green enough to see Yeovil through to the fourth round for only the fourth time in their history. Yeovil then faced Forest Green Rovers in the third round of the EFL Trophy, and secured back-to-back 2–0 wins with goals from Nathan and Connor Smith enough to secure qualification to the quarter-finals of the competition. Having established himself in the Yeovil team, attacker Jordan Green was rewarded with a new contract until the summer of 2019, while defender Tom James also signed an improved contract. On 13 January, Yeovil drew 1–1 away at relegation rivals Port Vale, with François Zoko scoring his tenth goal of the season to give the Glovers the lead but they conceded in the final five minutes to drop two points. The following week saw the club confirm that they had received a "substantial bid" for winger Otis Khan which had met a release clause in his contract, and that there had also been interest in defender Omar Sowunmi. On 20 January, Yeovil faced Chesterfield in a relegation six-pointer, after falling behind against the run of play Lewis Wing equalised with a 25-yard looping shot, his first goal for the club. In the final minute of injury time after Otis Khan appeared to have his shirt pulled he stopped playing allowing Chestefield to go up the other end to score a late winner with Khan then being sent off for shoving referee Kevin Johnson. Yeovil appealed the decision to send the midfielder off, but the appeal was deemed frivolous and Khan's ban was subsequently extended to five matches.

On 26 January, Yeovil faced Manchester United in the fourth round of the FA Cup in front of a sell out crowd of 9,195. Prior to the game Yeovil announced the signing of Alex Fisher on a free transfer from Scottish Premiership side Motherwell, with the striker signing an 18-month contract. The Glovers started the game brightly, but conceded just before half-time with Marcus Rashford giving the Premier League side the lead. During half-time the club confirmed the signing of Yeovil-born forward Ryan Seager on loan from Southampton until the end of the season. Ander Herrera extended Manchester United's lead after an hour before the superior quality of the Premier League side saw the Glovers concede two late goals to be knocked out of the FA Cup with a 4–0 defeat. The following day, the club confirmed their third signing of the weekend with West Bromwich Albion defender Shaun Donnellan, nephew of former Yeovil midfielder Gary, signing on an 18-month contract. Yeovil ended the month with a 3–0 victory over Grimsby Town with the visitors having been reduced to nine men, the Glovers ran out comfortable winners with goals from Lewis Wing, Rhys Browne and Jake Gray.

February
Yeovil secured their second win in a week with a 2–0 victory over Cambridge United, on 3 February 2018. Second half goals from defender Nathan Smith and substitute Alex Fisher's first for the club were enough to secure successive victories. On 6 February, Yeovil qualified for the semi-final of the EFL Trophy with a 3–2 victory over League One side Fleetwood Town. Having fallen behind, a last minute winner from top scorer François Zoko set up a tie with Shrewsbury Town. Yeovil then traveled to relegation-threatened Crewe Alexandra and secured a goalless draw having not had any shots on target. The match saw the Glovers lose both ever-present goalkeeper Artur Krysiak and defender Nathan Smith to long-term knee injuries. A 2–0 victory over bottom side Barnet saw the Glovers extend their unbeaten run to five matches in all competitions with a first-minute penalty from Sam Surridge and an injury time goal from Zoko enough to see Yeovil rise to 17th place in the league. The club's unbeaten run game to an end with a heavy 4–1 defeat away at Stevenage with Ryan Seager scoring Yeovil's consolation goal. Following the injury to Krysiak, the club signed experienced goalkeeper Stuart Nelson following his release from Gillingham on a contract until the end of the season. On 24 February, Yeovil suffered a second successive defeat losing 1–0 at home to Carlisle United, the match saw midfielder Jake Gray suffer a season-ending ankle injury. Freezing conditions at the end of February and early March saw Yeovil's EFL Trophy semi-final against Shrewsbury Town was postponed for seven days, as well as the club's league fixture against Swindon Town.

March
Following the postponement of their match against Swindon, Yeovil began March with their rearranged EFL Trophy semi-final tie against League One leaders Shrewsbury Town. The Glovers held their own but rarely threatened, and were knocked out courtesy of a Carlton Morris goal. On 7 March, defender Bevis Mugabi received a second call-up to the Uganda national football team for their March friendly matches. On 10 March, Yeovil suffered a 2–0 home defeat against Newport County. Due to international call-ups for Bevis Mugabi, Rhys Browne, Shaun Donnellan and Corey Whelan, Yeovil's trip to Accrington Stanley was postponed until the 17 April. Debuts for Stuart Nelson and Shaun Donnellan saw Yeovil end their three match losing run with a 0–0 draw away at promotion chasing Exeter City, this was then followed by a 1–0 away win at Colchester United with Nelson saving an early penalty before Alex Fisher scored the winning goal. The international break saw Bevis Mugabi make his full international debut for Uganda in friendlies against São Tomé and Príncipe and Malawi, while Rhys Browne scored his first international goal for Antigua and Barbuda in a 3–2 win against Bermuda. Donnellan and Whelan both featured for the Republic of Ireland U21s, with Donnellan scoring a crucial winning goal against Azerbaijan. The end of March also saw fans select the club's new shirt for the 2018–19 season made by TAG Sportswear, while the home match against Forest Green Rovers on Good Friday was postponed due to a waterlogged pitch.

April and May
Easter Monday saw Yeovil travel to play-off chasing Coventry City. Braces from Alex Fisher, François Zoko and Sam Surridge saw the Glovers win 6–2, the first time the club had scored six goals away from home in the Football League. On 7 April, Yeovil suffered a 3–0 home defeat against Luton Town, the match saw both Ryan Dickson and Zoko dismissed for the Glovers. In recognition of his performances in the EFL Trophy defender Tom James was named in the team of the tournament. Early April saw the club announce that it had made a small profit of £28,350 for the financial year ending June 2017. On 10 April, Yeovil traveled to Swindon Town and earned a point courtesy of late Alex Fisher equaliser. The 2–2 draw saw goalkeeper Stuart Nelson suffer a wrist injury that ruled him out for the remainder of the season. The Glovers suffered a fourth consecutive home defeat without scoring, on 14 April, with a 1–0 defeat against Wycombe Wanderers. Yeovil then suffered a 2–0 defeat away at Accrington Stanley, a match which saw the Lancashire side clinch promotion to League One for the first time in their history. A late Alex Fisher consolation was the only moment of cheer for Yeovil in a heavy 4–1 defeat away at promotion chasing Notts County, on 21 April. On 24 April, Yeovil and Forest Green Rovers played out a goalless draw which secured both sides Football League status with two games to spare. Yeovil's final home match of the season, saw them entertain Mansfield Town, the Glovers took the lead twice through Bevis Mugabi and Zoko, who scored his fifteenth goal of the season, but play-off chasing Mansfield fought back to win the game 3–2. Defender Omar Sowunmi was sent off late on the club's tenth red card of the season. The club's end of season awards, followed the conclusion of the match with all the awards shared between the trio of Tom James, Omar Sowunmi and François Zoko. Yeovil ended the season with a 1–1 defeat away at Lincoln City to finish the season in 19th place.

Summary and aftermath
In the league the team won 8 matches, drew 5 and lost 10 at home, compared to winning 4, drawing 7 and losing 12 away from home. The club scored 59 league goals and conceded 75 the third most in the league. Sam Surridge recorded the highest number of appearances during the season, appearing in 53 of Yeovil's 59 matches. François Zoko finished as the club's top goalscorer for the third consecutive season with 15 goals, 13 of those coming in the league.

The end of the season saw manager Darren Way release four players. Defender Daniel Alfei was released having spent most of the season injured, and the experienced trio of Ryan Dickson, Artur Krysiak and Nathan Smith were released having made 130, 150 and 295 appearances for the club respectively. 36-year old goalkeeper Stuart Nelson agreed a new two-year contract, while the club triggered a one-year extension in midfielder Alefe Santos's contract. The club also offered new deals to Oscar Gobern and Omar Sowunmi. Yeovil offered no professional contracts to any of the club's second year scholars, with defender Joe Tomlinson signing for Premier League side Brighton & Hove Albion upon his release. Midfielder Oscar Gobern rejected the offer of a new deal to sign for National League side Eastleigh. On 26 June, goalkeeper Jonny Maddison agreed to terminate his contract to sign for National League North side Darlington. In late June, the club received a bid in the region of £100,000 which met the release clause of attacking midfielder Otis Khan from fellow League Two side Mansfield Town, Khan subsequently signed a two-year contract with the Nottinghamshire side. Defender Omar Sowunmi returned to the club for pre-season training having still not signed a new contract.

The off season saw Bevis Mugabi called up by Uganda for an invitational tournament in Niger.

Transfers

In

Out

Loan in

Loan out

Match details

League Two

League table

FA Cup

EFL Cup

EFL Trophy

Group table

Squad statistics
Source:

Numbers in parentheses denote appearances as substitute.
Players with squad numbers struck through and marked  left the club during the playing season.
Players with names in italics and marked * were on loan from another club for the whole of their season with Yeovil.
Players listed with no appearances have been in the matchday squad but only as unused substitutes.
Key to positions: GK – Goalkeeper; DF – Defender; MF – Midfielder; FW – Forward

Suspensions

Footnotes

A.  Yeovil Town won 3–2 after extra time.
B.  Yeovil Town won 5–3 in a penalty shootout following a 1–1 draw in normal time.

See also
 2017–18 in English football
 List of Yeovil Town F.C. seasons

References

2017–18 EFL League Two by team
2017-18